The Khatra Khatra Show (formerly known as Khatra, Khatra, Khatra and The Khatra Show) is an Indian comedy game show series starring Bharti Singh and Haarsh Limbachiyaa along with many guest stars that aired on Colors TV. The show is also digitally available on Voot.

The first season aired from 11 March 2019 to 11 September 2019.

The second season aired from 14 September 2019 to 2 November 2019.

The third season aired from 13 March 2022 to 20 May 2022.

Plot
Bharti, Harsh and others have a short skit. Later, they play games on the show and losers are given (funny) punishments. They contestants also pranks each other. In the meantime, all the celebs crack jokes on each - other. Bharti and Harsh also taunt each- other. In Season 1-2, Amidst the episode, Gaurav Dubey enters portraying different characters such as Khatri and cracks jokes on all the celebs.

Series overview

Cast

Host
 Haarsh Limbachiyaa as himself (Season 1–3)
 Bharti Singh as herself (Season 1–3)
 Punit Pathak as himself (Season 1–3)
 Aditya Narayan as himself  (Season 1–3)
 Farah Khan as herself (Season 3)
 Gaurav Dubey as Khatri/Budget Sharma/Various characters (season 1-2) 
 Garvit Parekh as various characters(season 1-3)

Guests/contestants
 Raghav Juyal
 Jasmin Bhasin
 Jannat Zubair Rahmani
 Anita Hassanandani
 Avika Gor
 Ridhima Pandit
 Usha Nadkarni
 Shraddha Arya
 Hina Khan
 Neha Pendse
 Neeti Mohan
 Shruti Sharma
 Aditi Bhatia
 Karan Patel
 Rubina Dilaik
 Reem Shaikh
 Ishita Dutta
 Aparna Dixit
 Aastha Gill
 Aparshakti Khurana 
 Tahira Kashyap
 Anushka Sen
 Debina Bonnerjee
 Sana Makbul 
 Swapnil Joshi
 Priya Banerjee
 Aryan Prajapati
 Rashami Desai
 Karan Kundra
 Sanaya Irani
 Kanika Mann
 Mallika Sherawat
 Surbhi Chandna
 Karishma Tanna
 Erica Fernandes
 Parth Samthaan
 Tulsi Kumar
 Kritika Kamra
 Sagarika Ghatge
 Monalisa
 Nagma Mirajkar
 Nora Fatehi
 Niti Taylor
 Akansha Ranjan
 Neha Kakkar
 Sonu Kakkar
 Rani Chatterjee
 Rakhi Sawant
 Abhishek Verma
 Vighnesh Pande
 Mika Singh
 Mudassar Khan
 Varun Sharma
 Pearl V Puri
 Ravi Kishan
 Shantanu Maheshwari
 Nikitin Dheer
 Awez Darbar
 Abhinav Shukla
 Krip Suri
 Vishal Vashishtha
 Divyansh Dwivedi
 Badshah
 Vikas Gupta
 Tusshar Kapoor
 Oupseng Namchum
 Tony Kakkar
 Darshan Raval
 Ankit Tiwari
 Marzi Pestonji
Priyank Sharma
 Dharmesh Yelande
 Avinesh Rekhi 
 Himansh Kohli
 Akshat Singh
 Arjun Bijlani
 Mohit Malik
 Karan Singh Grover
 Tushar Kalia
 Sohail Khan
 Meet Bros
 Prince Narula
 Raghav Juyal 
 Karanvir Bohra
 Jubin Nautiyal 
 Hitesh Bharadwaj
 Puja Banerjee
 Sana Khan
 Spandan Chaturvedi
 Meera Deosthale
 Mohena Kumari Singh
 Babai Karmakar
 Sonu Sood
 Shakti Mohan
 Mukti Mohan
 Bhumi Pednekar
 Tapsee Pannu
 Karan Kundrra
 Vineet Kumar
 Teejay Sidhu
 Jacqueline Fernandez
 Parineeti Chopra
 Geeta Basra
 Harbhajan Singh
 Karan Kundrra
 Munmun Dutta
 Nikki Tamboli
 Nishant Bhat
 Rashami Desai
 Rahul Vaidya
 Umar Riaz
 Vishal Aditya Singh
 Aly Goni
 Tejasswi Prakash
Shamita Shetty
 Nimrit Ahluwalia

See also
 List of Hindi comedy shows

References 

Indian comedy television series
Colors TV original programming
2019 Indian television series debuts
Indian game shows
Indian television sketch shows